Steele Creek Presbyterian Church and Cemetery is a historic Presbyterian church complex and national historic district located near Charlotte, Mecklenburg County, North Carolina. The church was founded in 1760 and the current sanctuary was built in 1889, and is a rectangular, Gothic Revival style brick building. It is five bays wide and six bays deep, and has pointed-arched sash windows, shallow buttresses, and steeply pitched roof parapet. The cemetery contains approximately 1,700 headstones, with the oldest dating to 1763.

It was added to the National Register of Historic Places in 1991.

References

External links

Churches in Charlotte, North Carolina
Presbyterian churches in North Carolina
Cemeteries in North Carolina
Protestant Reformed cemeteries
Churches on the National Register of Historic Places in North Carolina
Historic districts on the National Register of Historic Places in North Carolina
Gothic Revival church buildings in North Carolina
Churches completed in 1889
19th-century Presbyterian church buildings in the United States
National Register of Historic Places in Mecklenburg County, North Carolina
1889 establishments in North Carolina